Ewerton Paixão da Silva (born 28 December 1996), commonly known as Ewerton, is a Brazilian football winger who plays for Slavia Prague.

Club career

FC ViOn Zlaté Moravce - Vráble
Ewerton Paixão da Silva made his professional Fortuna Liga debut for FC ViOn Zlaté Moravce - Vráble against FC DAC 1904 Dunajská Streda on 10 December 2016.

Career statistics

References

External links
 
  (archive)
 Ewerton Paixao da Silva at Futbalnet.sk 
 Ewerton at ZeroZero.pt 
 

1996 births
Living people
Brazilian footballers
Brazilian expatriate footballers
Association football forwards
Sportspeople from Rio Grande do Sul
São Bernardo Futebol Clube players
FC ViOn Zlaté Moravce players
FK Mladá Boleslav players
FK Pardubice players
Slovak Super Liga players
Czech National Football League players
Czech First League players
Expatriate footballers in the Czech Republic
Expatriate footballers in Slovakia
Brazilian expatriate sportspeople in the Czech Republic
Brazilian expatriate sportspeople in Slovakia
SK Slavia Prague players